The men's decathlon event at the 2017 Summer Universiade was held on 24 and 25 August at the Taipei Municipal Stadium.

Medalists

Results

100 metres 
Wind:
Heat 1: -0.4 m/s, Heat 2: -0.6 m/s, Heat 3: -1.2 m/s

 
Notes: YC=Yellow Card

Long jump

Shot put

High jump

400 metres

110 metres hurdles 
Wind:
Heat 1: -1.6 m/s, Heat 2: -0.2 m/s, Heat 3: +1.2 m/s

Note: Fn: False start.

Discus throw

Pole vault

Javelin throw

1500 metres

Final standings

References

Decathlon
2017